Israel Quitcón (8 September 1928 – April 1977) was a Puerto Rican boxer. He competed in the men's light heavyweight event at the 1948 Summer Olympics.

References

1928 births
1977 deaths
Puerto Rican male boxers
Olympic boxers of Puerto Rico
Boxers at the 1948 Summer Olympics
People from Santurce, Puerto Rico
Light-heavyweight boxers
20th-century Puerto Rican people